Cyperus insularis is a species of sedge that is native to the north island of New Zealand.

See also 
 List of Cyperus species

References 

insularis
Plants described in 2005
Flora of New Zealand